Isleton Bridge is a historic bascule bridge carrying California State Route 160 across the Sacramento River north of Isleton, California, built in 1923. The bridge was designed by Sacramento County engineer Charles W. Deterding, with the Strauss Bascule Bridge Company of Chicago designing the bascule span. Steel portions of the bridge were fabricated by the American Bridge Company and the bridge was constructed by Jenkins & Elton of Sacramento.

See also
List of bridges documented by the Historic American Engineering Record in California
List of crossings of the Sacramento River

References

Further reading

External links

Bridges completed in 1923
Historic American Engineering Record in California
Road bridges in California
Bascule bridges in the United States
Bridges over the Sacramento River
Bridges in Sacramento County, California
Steel bridges in the United States
Tied arch bridges in the United States
1923 establishments in California